Alias Big Shot (Spanish: Alias Gardelito) is a 1961  Argentine drama film directed by Lautaro Murúa and written by Augusto Roa Bastos and Bernardo Kordon. The film starred Alberto Argibay, Virginia Lago and Walter Vidarte. It won the Silver Condor Award for Best Picture.

In a survey of the 100 greatest films of Argentine cinema carried out by the Museo del Cine Pablo Ducrós Hicken in 2000, the film reached the 19th position.

Synopsis

The drama directed by Lautaro Murua is about the difficulty of living an honest life in the face of an unrelenting poverty. The title of this story is taken from the name of the great Argentine singer Carlos Gardel, the idol of the antihero Toribio portrayed by Alberto Argibay. Toribio's goal in life is to emulate the famous singer and making his own way successfully in the music business. Yet at the same time, he does not stop his illegal means of making ends meet, stealing and petty thievery. Discouraged when his big break never quite materializes, Toribio heads for disaster when he joins up with a large smuggling scheme.

Cast
 Alberto Argibay ....  Toribio Torres, alias "Gardelito"
 Walter Vidarte ....  Picayo, a friend
 Lautaro Murúa ....  Boss
 Virginia Lago ... Girl, Toribio's neighbor
 Nora Palmer ....  Margot
 Tonia Carrero ... Pilar
 Raúl Parini ... Feasini
 Raúl del Valle ... Julián
 Orlando Sacha ... Leoncio
 Nelly Tesolín
 Héctor Pellegrini

Other
 Rafael Diserio
 Cacho Espíndola
 Carmen Giménez ....  Tía
 Alberto Barcel ....  (uncredited)

Overview
A representative of the "new cinemas" that arose in the late 50s and early 60s, Murúa's Alias Gardelito ranks among the best of Argentine cinema in the period, along with films by Simón Feldman, David José Kohon, Rodolfo Kuhn, Manuel Antín, René Mugica. According to Paulo Antonio Paranaguá (O cinema na América Latina), in these works the characters' psychology takes the upper hand upon social themes, although usually the latter also provide a significant context for their action, as is the case here.

Release and acclaim
The film premiered in 1961. Produced by Rio Negro Productions it was distributed by Cinemagroup in 2002 on DVD.

References

External links
 

1961 films
1960s Spanish-language films
1961 drama films
Argentine black-and-white films
Argentine drama films
1960s Argentine films